In mathematics, specifically in order theory and functional analysis, the order topology of an ordered vector space  is the finest locally convex topological vector space (TVS) topology on  for which every order interval is bounded, where an order interval in  is a set of the form  where  and  belong to  

The order topology is an important topology that is used frequently in the theory of ordered topological vector spaces because the topology stems directly from the algebraic and order theoretic properties of  rather than from some topology that  starts out having. 
This allows for establishing intimate connections between this topology and the algebraic and order theoretic properties of  
For many ordered topological vector spaces that occur in analysis, their topologies are identical to the order topology.

Definitions 

A neighborhood of the origin in the order topology is necessarily an absorbing set because  for all  

For every  let  and endow  with its order topology (which makes it into a normable space). 
The set of all 's is directed under inclusion and if  then the natural inclusion of  into  is continuous. 

The lattice structure can compensate in part for any lack of an order unit:

If  is a regularly ordered vector lattice then the ordered topology is the finest locally convex TVS topology on  making  into a locally convex vector lattice.
In particular, if the order of a vector lattice  is regular then the order topology is generated by the family of all lattice seminorms on

Properties 

Throughout,  will be an ordered vector space and  will denote the order topology on  

 Each positive linear operator between two ordered vector spaces is continuous for the respective order topologies. 
 Each order unit of an ordered TVS is interior to the positive cone for the order topology. 
 If  is an Archimedean ordered vector space over the real numbers having an order unit and let  denote the order topology on  Then  is an ordered TVS that is normable,  is the finest locally convex TVS topology on  such that the positive cone is normal, and the following are equivalent: 
 is complete.
 In particular, if  is an Archimedean ordered vector space having an order unit then the order  is a regular order and  

Relation to subspaces, quotients, and products 

Examples 

The order topology of a finite product of ordered vector spaces (this product having its canonical order) is identical to the product topology of the topological product of the constituent ordered vector spaces (when each is given its order topology).

See also

References

Bibliography

  
  

Functional analysis
Order theory